Awka Liwen (“Rebellion at Dawn”) is a documentary film directed by Mariano Aiello and Kristina Hille, with a script by Osvaldo Bayer, Mariano Aiello and Kristina Hille. The work develops the history of the possession of the land in Argentina. It is also a history of racism against the indigenous peoples, where racism was the alibi for their exploitation and elimination. Awka Liwen, which in the Mapuche language means “Rebel at Dawn”, was filmed in Chubut, Jujuy, Río Negro, the province and city of Buenos Aires and Germany.

Pre-screening
The pre-screening of the work was in November 2009 in the National Library of Buenos Aires. The premiere of the film took place in the Cinema Gaumont, the traditional movie theatre in the city of Buenos Aires, where around 3000 people came.

Awards and honors
Awka Liwen is the winner in the category documentary film of the International Festival of the Political Film (FICIP) in Argentina and the International Festival of Digital Cinematographic Art Imperia, sponsored by UNESCO. It obtained a special award for the Best Feature Film Recommended for Schools at the International Festival "A Film for Peace" and a special Award "El Sombreito" at the International Film Festival Tandil. The film has been officially selected in other film festivals.

Awka Liwen has been declared to be of “National Interest” by the Presidency of Argentina; Declared to be of “Cultural Interest for the Nation”; Declared to be of “Interest for the Ministry of Science, Technology and Productive Innovation”; Declared to be of “Social Interest” by the Argentine Ministry of Social Development”; Declared to be of “Interest to the Honorable Argentine Chamber of Deputies”; “Declared of Interest” by the Argentine Institute against Discrimination, Xenophobia and Racism (INADI); “Underwritten Institutionally” by the Argentine Institute of Indian Affairs (INAI); “Underwritten by the Secretariat of Human Rights of the Argentine Ministry of Justice, Security and Human Rights”; Declared to be of “Educational and Cultural Interest” by the General Office of Culture and Education of the Government of the Province of Buenos Aires”; Declared to be of “Educational Interest” by the Government of the Province of Chubut; Declared to be of “Municipal Interest” by the City of Rosario (Government Commission); Declared to be of “Cultural Interest” by the Rural Commune of Cushamen; Declared to be of “Provincial Interest” by the Province of Río Negro); Declared to be of “Provincial Interest” by the Province of Salta; Declared to be of “Municipal Interest” by the Municipality of Morón; Declared to be of “Educational Interest” by the Municipality of Morón; Declared to be of “Municipal Interest” by the Municipality of Berazategui; Declared to be of “Municipal Interest” by the Municipality of Ituzaingó; And declared to be of “Municipal Interest” by the County of General San Martín.

Update

Two young members of the family Martínez de Hoz sued Osvaldo Bayer, Mariano Aiello and Felipe Pigna in 2011 alleging that the film includes false historical statements and footage of the family for defamatory purposes and that damage claimants' rights. At the moment (July 2014) there are not resolution in the trial. Macanudo Films, Osvaldo Bayer and Mariano Aiello are making a new feature documentary called Martinez de Hoz, that the Argentine film institute has considered of "no public interest".

References

External links

Argentine documentary films
2010 films
2010 documentary films
2010s Spanish-language films
Documentary films about indigenous rights
2010s Argentine films